Veselyi Podil is a railway station in  Semenivka, Poltava Oblast.

See also
Ukrzaliznytsia - the national railway company of Ukraine

References

External links

 Timetable of the station Veselyi Podil (Ukraine)

Southern Railways (Ukraine) stations
Railway stations in Poltava Oblast
Railway stations opened in 1887